Tessella leucomelas is a moth in the family Erebidae. It was described by Hervé de Toulgoët in 2000. It is found in French Guiana.

References

Moths described in 2000
Phaegopterina